The Hälsinglands Fotbollförbund (Hälsingland Football Association) is one of the 24 district organisations of the Swedish Football Association. It administers lower tier football in Hälsingland, a historical province in Norrland.

Background 

Hälsinglands Fotbollförbund, commonly referred to as Hälsinglands FF, was founded on 25 March 1917 and is the governing body for football in the historical province of Hälsingland which now constitutes the northern part of Gävleborg County. Minor parts of the province are in Jämtland County and in Västernorrland County. The Association currently has 61 member clubs.  Based in Söderhamn, the Association's Chairman is Dan Jonsson.

Affiliated Members 

The following clubs are affiliated to the Hälsinglands FF:

Alfta GIF Fotboll
Arbrå BK
Bergsjö IF
Bjuråkers GIF
BK Vismarå
Bogårdens IK
Bollnäs GIF FF
Delsbo IF
Edsbyns IF FF
Enångers IK
Färila IF
Föne IK
Forsa IF
Hällbo IF
Harmångers IF
Hassela IF
Hennans IK
Högs SK
Holmsvedens AIK
Hudiksvalls Allmänna BK
IF Team Hudik
IFK Bergvik
IFK Gnarp
Iggesunds IK
IK Hälsingbocken
Ilsbo SK
Järvsö BK
Jättendals IF
Kårböle IF
Kilafors IF
Korskrogens IK
Landafors SK
Långheds IF
Ljusdals IF
Ljusne AIK FF
Loos IF
Marma IF
Marma/Mohed FF
Moheds SK
Näsvikens IK
Njutångers IF
Norrala IF
Norrbo IF
Norrfjärns IF
Nors AIK
Ramsjö SK
Rengsjö SK
Sandarne SIF
Skogs Förenade FK
Söderala Allmänna IK
Söderhamns FF
Strands IF
Strömsbruks IF
Stugsunds IK
Tallåsens IF
Trönö IK
Vallsta IF
Växbo IF
Viksjöfors IF FF
Wallviks IK
Ängebo IK

League Competitions 
Hälsinglands FF run the following League Competitions:

Men's Football
Division 4  -  one section
Division 5  -  one section
Division 6  -  one section
Division 7  -  one section

Women's Football
Division 3  -  one section
Division 4  -  two sections

Footnotes

External links 
 Hälsinglands FF Official Website 

Hälsinglands
Football in Gävleborg County
1917 establishments in Sweden